"Energetic" is a song recorded by South Korean singer BoA, released for her debut English repackage album BoA: Deluxe on July 21, 2009. A CD remix edition of "Energetic" was additionally released in January 2010. Commercially, the song debuted at number 48 on the Billboard Hot Dance Club Songs chart before peaking at number 17.

Music video 
The music video for "Energetic" was shot between June 3, 2009 and June 5, 2009. It features BoA with her back-up dancers hitting a club, and becoming the center of the club. "Energetic" was the first video to be on BoA's official YouTube-channel, along with "I Did It for Love", on November 25, 2009.

Track listing 
 Digital single – tracklist
 "Energetic" (radio edit) – 3:25
 "Energetic" (album version) – 3:40

 Remixes CD – tracklist
 "Energetic" (Mike Rizzo Funk Generation radio edit)
 "Energetic" (Razor N Guido radio edit)
 "Energetic" (radio edit)
 "Energetic" (Mike Rizzo Funk Generation club mix)
 "Energetic" (Mike Rizzo Funk Generation dub mix)
 "Energetic" (Razor N Guido club mix)
 "Energetic" (Razor N Guido dub)
 "Energetic" (Razor N Guido instrumental)

Charts

References 

BoA songs
2010 songs
Songs written by Sean Garrett